The Lady in White (Swedish: Vita frun) is a 1962 Swedish mystery thriller film directed by Arne Mattsson and starring Nils Asther, Anita Björk and Karl-Arne Holmsten. It was shot at the Råsunda Studios in Stockholm. The film's sets were designed by the art director Jan Boleslaw.

Cast
 Nils Asther as Simon Ek
 Anita Björk as 	Helen G:son Lundberg
 Jan Malmsjö as 	Roger von Schöffer
 Karl-Arne Holmsten as John Hillman
 Sif Ruud as 	Eivor Jansson
 Nils Hallberg as 	Freddy Sjöström
 Lena Granhagen as Sonja Svensson
 Elisabeth Odén as 	Agneta
 Tor Isedal as Torbjörn Strand
 Hjördis Petterson as 	Julia Rask
 Gio Petré as 	Eva von Schöffer
 Margit Carlqvist as 	Maria, Maid 
 Britta Brunius as Selma Rask
 Elisabet Falk as Maud Bergstedt
 Olle Björklund as Rune Ahlgren
 Inger Bengtsson as 	Bus Driver 
 Hugo Björne as 	Lawyer 
 Tor Borong as 	Servant 
 Curt Ericson as Policeman 
 Mona Geijer-Falkner as 	Fru Andersson 
 Curt Löwgren as Taxichaufför

References

Bibliography 
 Krawc, Alfred. International Directory of Cinematographers, Set- and Costume Designers in Film: Denmark, Finland, Norway, Sweden (from the beginnings to 1984). Saur, 1986.
 Qvist, Per Olov & von Bagh, Peter. Guide to the Cinema of Sweden and Finland. Greenwood Publishing Group, 2000.

External links 
 

1962 films
Swedish thriller films
1960s mystery films
Swedish mystery films
1960s thriller films
1960s Swedish-language films
Films directed by Arne Mattsson
Swedish sequel films
1960s Swedish films